Quinton Griffith (born 27 February 1992) is an Antiguan footballer who plays for Five Islands and the Antigua and Barbuda national team.

Club career
Griffith began his career in 2009 playing for Golden Stars, who he helped achieved promotion from the Antiguan Second Division to Antiguan First Division in 2008–09.

In 2011 Griffith transferred to the new Antigua Barracuda FC team prior to its first season in the USL Professional Division. He made his debut for the Barracudas on 17 April 2011 in the team's first ever competitive game, a 1–2 loss to the Los Angeles Blues. He signed for Charleston Battery in 2013.

International career
Griffith made his debut for the Antigua and Barbuda national team in 2009, and has since received over fifty caps, scoring nine goals. He was part of the Antigua squad which took part in the final stages of the 2010 Caribbean Championship and 2014 World Cup qualification.

Career statistics

International

International goals
Scores and results list Antigua and Barbuda's goal tally first.

References

External links
Charleston Battery bio

1992 births
Living people
Antigua and Barbuda footballers
Antigua and Barbuda expatriate footballers
Antigua and Barbuda international footballers
Antigua Barracuda F.C. players
Charleston Battery players
Expatriate soccer players in the United States
USL Championship players
Antigua and Barbuda expatriate sportspeople in the United States
2014 Caribbean Cup players
People from St. John's, Antigua and Barbuda
Association football wingers
Association football fullbacks